Ulli Kinalzik (born February 26, 1939 in Grabów, Poland) is a German actor, starring in many films spanning five decades.

Selected filmography

 Derrick - Season 2, Episode 2 "Tod am Bahngleis" (1975)
 Derrick - Season 3, Episode 4: "Tote Vögel singen nicht" (1976)
 Derrick - Season 5, Episode 10: "Der Spitzel" (1978)
 Derrick - Season 9, Episode 1: "Eine Rose im Müll" (1982)
 Derrick - Season 11, Episode 6: "Keine schöne Fahrt nach Rom" (1984)

External links

Gaetani Actors Management Munich 

1939 births
Living people
German male television actors
German male film actors